Sara García Hidalgo (8 September 1895 – 21 November 1980) was a Mexican actress who made her biggest mark during the "Golden Age of Mexican cinema". During the 1940s and 1950s, she often played the part of a no-nonsense but lovable grandmother in numerous Mexican films. In later years, she played parts in Mexican telenovelas.

García is remembered by her nickname, La Abuelita de México ("Mexico's Grandmother").

Life and career

1895–1917: Childhood 

Sara García Hidalgo was born on 8 September 1895 at Orizaba Veracruz. Her parents were Andalusian, Isidoro García Ruiz, an architect, and his wife Felipa Hidalgo de Ruiz in 1895. They moved from Havana, Cuba. to Veracruz. Her father was hired for various jobs there.  Sarita was the only survivor of their eleven children.

In 1900, a storm caused the Santa Catarina river (which separated the family house from Sara's school) to overflow and knock down the bridge that crossed it. The children could not return to the other side of the river until the evening. Don Isidoro believed that he had lost his only daughter. The anguish caused him to suffer a stroke days later. Doña Felipa decided to sell her business, a papier-mâché factory, and travel to Mexico City to intern her husband into the Sociedad de Beneficencia Española de México (Spanish Welfare Society of Mexico). He died shortly after arriving. However her mother was contracted as the housekeeper there.

At age 9, Sara entered the prestigious Las Vizcaínas school as an intern. In 1905 a typhus epidemic invaded Mexico. Sara became infected and infected her mother Felipa, who died. She remained in the charge of the director of the institution, Cecilia Mallet,. Her good behavior and excellent grades allowed García to stay in school. The director of Las Vizcaínas noticed her great sensitivity and artistic inclination and directed her into painting. She also became a teacher and she had her students perform plays.

1917: Film debut in silent films 
Sara started her film career at age 22 when she was still a teacher. One day she decided to stroll by the Alameda and discovered the newly founded Azteca Films studios. She was curious, and came in. She was fascinated by everything she saw. From that moment she thought that she could also act, even if it was only in the theater. One day, watching Mimi Derba filming, (the first Mexican film diva,) an actor and official of Azteca Films noticed her curiosity and invited her to participate in what would be her first film En defensa Propia "In self-defense" (1917). After that she began auditioning in the theater where she started getting small roles. Her diction and voice gave her prestige and she became part of the most outstanding companies of that time: Mercedes Navarro, Prudencia Grifell and the sisters Anita and Isabelita Blanch. In one of her tours throughout the Mexican Republic, she met Fernando Ibáñez, whom she had seen during the filming of "La soñadora" (1917).

1918–1947: Golden Age of Mexican cinema and La Abuelita de México
In 1918, she married Fernando Ibáñez. They toured throughout Mexico and Central America, until at a stop in Tepic, she gave birth to a girl, whom they named Fernanda Mercedes Ibáñez García. Sara decided to take care of her daughter, and stopped touring. Her absence bothered Fernando, who began to get involved in several affairs, then became entangled with the head of the company. Sara divorced her husband and left with her daughter. Years later her ex-husband became sick, and returned home. Sara cared for him, even paying his expenses, until his death in 1932. Established firmly in the theater, she began to be called to work in the cinema. Her daughter Fernanda also ventured into the cinema with the movie "La madrina del diablo" (1937) in which she played Jorge Negrete's girlfriend. Outside the sets, Negrete courted her, though Sara disapproved. The romance ended abruptly and the following year (1938) Fernanda married the engineer Mariano Velasco Mújica, leaving to live in Ciudad Valles, Tamaulipas. A little more than two years later Fernanda became ill with typhoid fever and died on October 17, 1940. Due to her strong personality Sara survived her daughter 40 years.

García would later continue her extensive career in film and sacrificed her beauty when she decided, at the age of 40, to have her teeth removed so that her mouth would look like that of an older woman. She thought that thus she would be able to star as self-sacrificing ladies and better personify the roles they gave her.

Film actress Emma Roldán suggested Sara García for the role of Doña Panchita, an old woman, in the 1940 film Allá en el trópico ("There in the Tropics"). The film's director Fernando de Fuentes considered García too young for the part (indeed she was only in her mid 40s) but Roldán replied, saying "Sara is an actress, and actresses don't have an age". For the screen test, Sara García had a wig made for her. At the time of the screen test, the director asked the crew of her whereabouts and when they answered that she was the woman in front of him, the director was shocked: Her wig, lack of teeth, and performance had touched him. It is in Fernando de Fuentes' Allá en el trópico where Sara García won her title of la Abuelita de México (Mexico's Grandmother).

In 1942, Sara García co-starred with Joaquín Pardavé in El baisano Jalil, a comedy film in which she portrayed the wife of a Lebanese-immigrant family, one of the marginalized communities that settled in the La Lagunilla neighborhood of Mexico City. She starred again with Pardavé in a similar comedy, El barchante Neguib (1945).

She then started a long series of films, co-starring with the brightest stars of the Mexican cinema, such as Cantinflas, Jorge Negrete, Germán Valdés "Tin-Tan".

She often starred as the grandmother of famous Mexican actor Pedro Infante. Her most remembered film with him is the 1947 Los tres García where she also starred alongside Abel Salazar and Víctor Manuel Mendoza, playing the role of their grandmother with a strong, naughty and authoritarian attitude.

1947–1980: Multiple films, Telenovelas and final works 

García continued working with Pardave and appeared with him on El ropavejero "The junkman" (1947) and in Azahares para tu boda "Orange blossoms for your wedding" (1950), which were her last jobs with him. Garcia's nature was also deeply irreverent, and she showed it in films like Doña Clarines (1951), in which she makes fun of her grandmother's character, something she repeated in Las señoritas Vivanco "The Misses Vivanco" (1959) and in El proceso de las señoritas Vivanco "The process of the Misses Vivanco" (1961), in both she acted with Prudencia Grifell and was directed by Mauricio de la Serna.

In that decade she worked in both film and television, appearing in multiple soap operas such as "A Face in the Past" (1960), "La gloria Quedo atrás" (1962), and "La Duchess" (1966), in which a lottery ticket seller wins the jackpot and uses that money to get her daughter back, whom she had given up to her millionaire in-laws in the past.

In that decade we also saw her in the pages of a comic-book adventure story entitled "Doña Sara, la mera mera", in which she was dressed as the character she had made famous in Los tres García and Vuelven los García. In the 1970s, her grandmother character took part in films such as "Fin de fiesta" (1972), by Mauricio Walerstein, and Luis Alcoriza's "Mecánica Nacional" (1972), in which she utters some of the most famous insults of our cinematography. They were still charming, because they emanated from the mouth that had represented so much of Mexico's moral society.

In the 70s she appeared as Nana Tomasita, who looked after Cristina (Graciela Mauri) in the long-running telenovela Mundo de juguete (1974) and as a meticulous old woman from the "Caridad" segment, directed by Jorge Fons, in "Faith, Hope and Charity."

Personal life 
During her tenure with the College of Las Vizcaínas, she met Rosario González Cuenca, the daughter of a family that her parents had met on the ship from Cuba to Mexico. Years after their meeting, both of them reunited after García divorced Fernando Ibañez. At that time Rosario also was divorced. They began living together. Rosario acted as Fernanda's aunt. (Fernanda was Sara García's daughter.) Ulisex said that Rosario became Sara's female lover, as well as her assistant and business manager. García lived the rest of her life with her.

Of her co-stars, she adored Pedro Infante, but she couldn't stand Jorge Negrete. She hated Jorge because he had fallen in love with her daughter Fernanda. Many close friends affirm that she was a severe, even evil mother-in-law as well as not approving the relationship between Jorge and her daughter.

Later years and death 

García had her own television show in 1951, Media hora con Abuelita, but it failed and was cancelled. She returned to television in 1960 when she obtained a role in Un rostro en el pasado which was her first of eight telenovelas. These included Mundo de juguete in 1974, which as of (early 2006) was the longest-running telenovela in history, and Viviana with Lucía Méndez in 1978.

On 21 November 1980, Sara died at the National Medical Center in Mexico City at the age of 85, due to a cardiac arrest that arose from pneumonia. Days before she had been hospitalized after being injured by falling down the stairs of her house.

García was buried alongside her daughter in a mausoleum at the Panteón Español cemetery in Mexico City. While she was being buried, the song "Mi Cariñito" ("My Little Darling/Beloved One") was played. This song was the one that Pedro Infante sang to Sara several times. In particular, he sang it drunk and tearfully, as a lament after Sara’s character died in the movie Vuelven Los Garcia (The Garcias Return). It is said that the song was sung at her funeral by Lucha Villa.

Legacy 
 
In Mexico, García represented a grandmotherly figure due to her many roles as a grandmother in the movies she appeared in, and in 1973 she signed a commercial agreement to allow the chocolate company La Azteca use her image on Mexico's traditional Abuelita chocolate. La Azteca was later purchased by the Nestlé brand in 1995, who continued to use her image on the same brand.

Filmography

Telenovelas

Television shows

Documentaries

Cinema of Mexico

Cinema of the United States

Cinema of Italy

Cinema of Spain

References

External links 

 
 Sara García at the Cinema of Mexico site of the ITESM 

1895 births
1980 deaths
20th-century Mexican actresses
Actresses from Veracruz
Golden Age of Mexican cinema
Mexican people of Spanish descent
Mexican film actresses
Mexican silent film actresses
Mexican stage actresses
Mexican telenovela actresses
Mexican television presenters
People from Orizaba
Mexican women television presenters